Ogho-Oghene Omano Egwero (born 26 November 1988, in Egbo-Igbide, Delta, Nigeria) is a Nigerian sprinter who specializes in the 100 metres.

He competed at the 2009, 2011 and 2013 World Championships and the 2010 and 2016 World Indoor Championships.  He represented Nigeria at the 2012 and 2016 Olympics and the 2014 Commonwealth Games.

His personal best times are 6.60 seconds in the 60 metres (indoor), achieved in February 2011 in Düsseldorf; and 10.06 seconds in the 100 metres, achieved first in 2011 in Maputo and again in 2015 in Brazzaville.

References

1988 births
Living people
Nigerian male sprinters
Olympic athletes of Nigeria
Athletes (track and field) at the 2012 Summer Olympics
Athletes (track and field) at the 2010 Commonwealth Games
Athletes (track and field) at the 2014 Commonwealth Games
Athletes (track and field) at the 2018 Commonwealth Games
Athletes (track and field) at the 2016 Summer Olympics
Commonwealth Games competitors for Nigeria
World Athletics Championships athletes for Nigeria
African Games silver medalists for Nigeria
African Games medalists in athletics (track and field)
People from Enugu State
Athletes (track and field) at the 2015 African Games
Athletes (track and field) at the 2019 African Games
21st-century Nigerian people